HD 73526 b is an extrasolar planet orbiting about 61 million miles (0.66 AU) away from its parent star. This planet is more massive than Jupiter in the Solar System, so is most likely a gas giant. Based on its orbit and the stellar luminosity, the planet probably receives insolation 61% that of Mercury.

See also
 HD 73526 c

References

External links

Vela (constellation)
Giant planets
Exoplanets discovered in 2002
Exoplanets detected by radial velocity